18 Corps, 18th Corps, Eighteenth Corps, or XVIII Corps may refer to:

 18th Army Corps (France)
 XVIII Army Corps (Wehrmacht), a unit of the German Army 
 XVIII Corps (German Empire)
 XVIII Reserve Corps (German Empire)
 XVIII Corps (Ottoman Empire)
 XVIII Corps (United Kingdom)
 XVIII Airborne Corps, United States
 XVIII Corps (Union Army), a unit in the American Civil War

See also
 List of military corps by number 
 18th Division (disambiguation)
 18th Brigade (disambiguation)
 18th Regiment (disambiguation)
 18th Battalion (disambiguation)
 18 Squadron (disambiguation)